Bronto

 Bronto, an unofficial unit prefix, used to represent anything from 1015 to 1027 bytes, most often 1027
 Bronto Software, a software company
 "Bronto-" a prefix used in the classification of many large animals, such as Brontosaurus or Brontotherium
 PSA Bronto (Russian: ПСА Бронто) Russian company for the production of special vehicles and SUVs.

See also
Bronte (disambiguation)
Brontosaurus (disambiguation)